Jerzy Woyna Orlewicz (born 14 May 1943) is a Polish alpine skier. He competed in three events at the 1964 Winter Olympics.

References

1943 births
Living people
Polish male alpine skiers
Olympic alpine skiers of Poland
Alpine skiers at the 1964 Winter Olympics
Sportspeople from Zakopane
Universiade gold medalists for Poland
Universiade medalists in alpine skiing
Competitors at the 1964 Winter Universiade
Competitors at the 1966 Winter Universiade
20th-century Polish people